Evergreen Village Square is a town square in the Evergreen district of San Jose, California. The square is a prominent shopping and dining destination in East San Jose. Evergreen Village Square serves as an important venue for public events in Evergreen and also hosts a branch of the San José Public Library.

References

External links

Squares and plazas in San Jose
History of San Jose, California